The K-32 Turner Bridge was a bridge that crossed the Kansas River during its almost 60 mile journey through Kansas City, and Topeka. It first opened in 1955 as a two lane steel through-truss bridge. In 2001, the bridge was torn down, due to its major superstructure problems, and with the growing area, could no longer handle the traffic flow as a two lane. By late 2002, the through-truss was gone, and a new five lane girder was in place. The bridge now carries two lanes of eastbound traffic, and three lanes westbound. The Turner Bridge marks the beginning of the Turner Diagonal.

The first bridge in the area called the "Turner Bridge" was designed and announced in 1898.  The first bridge was a steel bridge with three spans and had an estimated cost of $60,000 to build.

There is as boat ramp located at the bridge site.  The ramp is located at river mile 9.2 of the Kansas River, gps N39.093 W94.711.

References

Bridges over the Kansas River
Bridges in Kansas City, Kansas
Bridges completed in 1955
Bridges completed in 2002
Road bridges in Kansas
2002 establishments in Kansas
Steel bridges in the United States
Girder bridges in the United States
1955 establishments in Kansas